Perthshire Rugby Football Club, formerly known as Perthshire Academicals, is a rugby union club located in the city of Perth, Scotland.

History
Founded in 1868, it is one of the oldest rugby clubs in Scotland. Perthshire was a consistently successful club in the third division of the old National League in Scotland until recently. Over the seasons 2003–04, 2004–05 and 2005–06, the club gained successive promotions, reaching Scottish Premiership Division 3 for the first time in the 2006–07 season. They remained in this league until 2012–13 season when they were relegated to Caledonia Regional League 1.

Perthshire also put a lot of emphasis into coaching youth players. The club has a development team who coach the youth teams and make regular visits to schools in the area to promote rugby.  Perthshire recently launched its centre of excellence, which was the first in the country.

In February 2020, the club's then-captain Adam Pattinson, 36, was killed in road accident while riding his bicycle to work (at Craigclowan Preparatory School) on the A912 Perth-to-Muirhead road.

Honours
 Scottish League Championship, fourth tier
 Champions (1): 2006–07

Notable players
Perthshire has provided Scottish internationalist with the first being Dr R W Irvine and Dr Charles Reid during the 1880s. Welsh captain J A G William played for the club in the early 1950s. Jimmy Greenwood was the club's last international cap. He toured South Africa with the British and Irish Lions in 1955. In more recent times Perthshire has provided the Scotland Sevens team with one of their Top Try Scorers. James Fleming played for Perthshire from the age of 7 up until the age of 21. During his time with Perth he picked up the award for Premier 3 Player of the Season in 2008/09. Fleming was a member of the 12-man squad who lifted the London 7s Cup in 2015, where he exhibited is admirable turn of pace and power to score Scotland's first try in 27–26 win over South Africa in the tournament climax. He currently has amassed 555 points for Scotland.

References

External links
Club website
Tennent's Scottish National League 3 (Men's) – ScottishRugby.org
Tennent's Scottish National League 3 Table – BBC Sport

Rugby clubs established in 1868
Scottish rugby union teams
Sport in Perth, Scotland
1868 establishments in Scotland
Rugby union in Perth and Kinross